The Finnish Kale (also Suomen romanit — "Finnish Romani") are a group of the Romani people who live primarily in Finland and Sweden. Their main languages are Finnish, Swedish and Finnish Romani.

History

The original Finnish Kale were Romanisæl who came to Finland via Sweden after being deported from Sweden in the 17th century. The ancestors of Finnish, Swedish and Norwegian Romani are English and Scottish Romani, who were deported from the kingdoms of Scotland and England. In 1637, all Romani groups were declared outlaws who could be hanged without trial; this practice was discontinued in 1748. When Finland declared independence in 1917, all Kales received full citizenship and rights. During the Winter War and Continuation War, about a thousand Kales served in the Finnish military.

Culture

Dress 
Finnish Kale commonly follow their traditions in both male and female dress. Finnish Kale women choose personally whether to don the traditional dress or not at around the age of 17 to 20, and the choice is considered final. In case of nontraditional wear, modesty customs are still followed.

Back in the 19th century, Finnish Kale men dressed nearly identical to the ethnic Finn farmers, in a coat, slacks, high boots, and a rimmed hat. In the early 20th century, many Kale men adopted the clothing style associated with the highly regarded profession of horse cab driver. This dress featured a white shirt, a jacket (sometimes in leather), a peaked cap, tall black boots, and baggy dark jodhpur trousers. The use of jodhpurs was very specific for the Finnish Kale, as Romani in other areas would have associated them with the often aggressive military, and thus avoided them.

During the 1960s and 70s, the peaked cap fell out of use, and the jodhpurs and boots were replaced with slacks and walking shoes. Jackets are still worn as traditional Kale modesty disallows appearing in only a shirt. Light-colored slacks or jeans are rarely seen. The driver-style dress is used only by some of the older men, or by younger men for special occasions.

The traditional female Finnish Kale dress stems from the traditional dress worn by the ethnic Finn women. Until the turn of the 20th century, Kale and Finn women dressed much alike in blouses, long skirts, and waist aprons. Over time and with increased wealth, the female Kale dress has become continually more decorated. The dress features a heavy full-length black velvet skirt worn relatively high at the waist, supported by padding, and a puffed blouse, often with prominent ruffles and lace, made of decorative cloth such as with sequins or a metallic sheen.

Young children wear similar clothing to other ethnicities. Girls approaching maturity, but still below the age to don the traditional dress, often wear long, narrow, dark skirts.

Music 

Music is a central part of Finnish Kale culture, everyday entertainment and domestic life. In Finland, the Kale are known especially for their contribution to the Finnish tango and Schlager music. Kale men have been a vital part of the Schlager scene since the start of the genre's popularity in Finland following World War II.

Since then, discrimination has lessened and Kale singers have no need to mask their birth names in order to succeed in their careers. Numerous Kale have participated in the Tangomarkkinat, a national tango singing contest, with winners including Sebastian Ahlgren, Amadeus Lundberg and Marco Lundberg.

Perceived problems of the Kale in Finland

Socioeconomic status
The Kale have traditionally held positions as craftsmen, but the occupation has lost its importance in modern times, leading to a significant rise in unemployment within the group. A paper published by the Ministry of Labour states that "According to labour administration's client register material, 70% of the Roma jobseekers had a primary school or lower secondary school education." According to the same paper: "Education is compulsory in Finland and this obligation applies equally to the Roma as to other citizens, but dropping out of basic education is still common among young Roma, while in the mainstream population it is extremely uncommon."

Violence and criminality

In 2007 police officer and boxer Riku Lumberg (of Romani heritage) wrote an open letter to his own people, seeking an end to the "barbaric tradition of blood feud" in the community. Roma artist Kiba Lumberg has said the following about the culture she grew up in: "Blood feud and the violence that exists in Roma culture can't be discussed in Finland. We can't accept that some groups hide behind culture to excuse stepping on human rights and freedom of speech," and "the problem is, that when a Gypsy dares to speak in public about the negative things happening in their own tribe, they face death threats. If a white person opens their mouth, they're accused of racism."

The Finnish Ministry of Justice indicated that in 2005, persons of Romani background (who make up less than 0.2% of the total population of Finland) perpetrated 18% of solved street robbery crimes in Finland. By way of comparison, the slightly larger Somali population (14,769 as opposed to an estimated 10,000) were responsible for 12%, while ethnic Finns were responsible for close to 51%. According to a 2003 report by the Finnish Department of Corrections, there were an estimated 120–140 Romanis in the Finnish prison system. The report discussed ways to combat institutional racism and discrimination within the prison system, as well as ways for improving rehabilitation of Romani inmates through, for example, education programmes and better cooperation with the Romani community at large.

Finnish Romani in Sweden 
From the 1950s, Finnish Romani have moved to Sweden, mainly due to better job opportunities and less discrimination. Around 4,500 Finnish Romani live in Sweden. They are the only Romani group in Sweden who wear their traditional dress. In Sweden it is easier for Finnish Romani to get a job and an apartment due to more Swedish sounding surnames as well as long tradition of multiculturalism in Sweden.

Notable people of Kale descent 

 Remu Aaltonen, drummer and singer
 Veijo Baltzar, author and director
Jasmine, singer
 Kiba Lumberg, author, artist and critic of violence in Roma culture
 Amadeus Lundberg, singer, Tango King
 Miranda Vuolasranta, activist and educator

See also
 Welsh Kale
 Romanichal Travellers (English Travellers)
 Romanisæl Travellers (Norwegian & Swedish Travellers)
Scottish Travellers
Irish Travellers
 Romani diaspora

References

Sources
 Finland's Romani People — Finitiko romaseele
 Paper on the unemployment of Finnish Kale by the Ministry of Labour (English summary included)

 
Romani groups
Finland
Roma
Kale
Kale
Kale
Romanichal